The white-bellied antpitta (Grallaria hypoleuca) is a species of bird in the family Grallariidae. It is found in Colombia, Ecuador and far northern Peru.

Its natural habitats are subtropical or tropical moist montane forest and heavily degraded former forest.

References

white-bellied antpitta
Birds of the Colombian Andes
Birds of the Ecuadorian Andes
white-bellied antpitta
white-bellied antpitta
Taxonomy articles created by Polbot
Taxobox binomials not recognized by IUCN